On 5 August 1984, a Biman Bangladesh Airlines Fokker F27-600 crashed into a marsh near Zia International Airport (now Shahjalal International Airport) in Dhaka, Bangladesh while landing in poor weather. The aircraft was performing a scheduled domestic passenger flight between Patenga Airport, Chittagong and Zia International Airport, Dhaka.

With a total death toll of 49 people, it is the deadliest aviation disaster to occur on Bangladeshi soil and also the airline's worst accident.

Aircraft and crew

The aircraft, a Fokker F27-600 registered S2-ABJ, was manufactured in 1971. It first flew for Indian Airlines but it was given to Biman in 1972, as a part of all the support given to Bangladesh by the Government of India following Bangladesh's Independence. At the time of the accident, the aircraft had flown more than 24,000 cycles and more than 15,500 airframe hours.

The captain of the flight was Kayes Ahmed Majumdar, an experienced pilot who had logged 5,000 flying hours. The first officer was Kaniz Fatema Roksana, who was the first female commercial pilot of Bangladesh.

Accident

The weather conditions in Dhaka were poor on the day of the accident; there was turbulence and heavy rain made visibility very poor. Amid these conditions, the crew first attempted a VOR approach to Zia International Airport's runway 32. As the runway was not spotted by either crew member, a missed approach was executed. The crew then tried an ILS approach on runway 14 of the same airport, but a missed approach had to be executed again as both pilots had failed to spot the runway once again. On the crew's third approach (second on runway 14), the plane got too low while it was still several hundred meters from the runway but neither crew member realized this (due to the poor visibility) and the plane crashed into a swamp about 550 meters short of the runway.

Passengers
There were a total of 45 passengers and 4 crew members on board the flight, all of whom perished in the crash. There was one Briton and one Japanese among the passengers, and the rest were Bangladeshi. Thirty-three of the passengers were traveling to Dhaka to catch connecting flights to the Middle East.

Notes

References

Aviation accidents and incidents in Bangladesh
Airliner accidents and incidents caused by weather
Aviation accidents and incidents in 1984
Airliner accidents and incidents involving controlled flight into terrain
Accidents and incidents involving the Fokker F27
1984 in Bangladesh
Biman Bangladesh Airlines
August 1984 events in Asia
1984 disasters in Bangladesh
Biman Bangladesh Airlines accidents and incidents